The Belt Subdivision is a railroad line owned by CSX Transportation in Buffalo, New York, U.S. The line connects the Buffalo Terminal Subdivision with the Niagara Subdivision along a former New York Central Railroad line.

History

It became part of the New York Central and Conrail through leases, mergers, and takeovers and was assigned to CSX in the 1999 breakup of Conrail.

See also
 List of CSX Transportation lines

References

CSX Transportation lines
Rail infrastructure in New York (state)
New York Central Railroad lines